Lamont "Lamart" Cooper (born December 2, 1973) is a former American football offensive specialist who played seven seasons in the Arena Football League with the Iowa Barnstormers, Milwaukee Mustangs, Oklahoma Wranglers and Buffalo Destroyers. He played college football at Wayne State College.

References

External links
Just Sports Stats

Living people
1973 births
Players of American football from Miami
American football wide receivers
Wayne State Wildcats football players
Iowa Barnstormers players
Milwaukee Mustangs (1994–2001) players
Oklahoma Wranglers players
Buffalo Destroyers players